The Bridge is a 2017 Nigerian film produced and directed by Kunle Afolayan.

Plot
A prince from a royal family decides to marry a lady from a wealthy home but their parents do not agree to their relationship due to tribal differences, as a result of this they got married secretly. This leads to things falling apart in their lives.

Cast

References

External links
 

English-language Nigerian films
2017 films
Nigerian drama films
2017 drama films
Films directed by Kunle Afolayan
2010s English-language films